Communist Youth League of Kampuchea (UNGEGN: Sâmpoăn Yŭvôkŏk) was a youth organization of Democratic Kampuchea (in present-day Cambodia) and the youth wing of the Communist Party of Kampuchea. The organization was initially called Democratic Youth League. It published Tong Kraham.

References

Youth wings of communist parties
Youth wings of political parties in Cambodia
Khmer Rouge